Chrysophyllum viridifolium, commonly known as fluted milkwood, is a potentially large (up to 20 m tall) species of evergreen milkwood tree that occurs in East African coastal forests, southerly coastal forest mosaics and in some inland forests of the tropics and subtropics.

Range and habitat
It is native to Kenya, Mozambique, Malawi, eastern Zimbabwe, Eswatini and South Africa (KZN and Eastern Cape provinces). Its habitat is coastal forest northwards of East London, and montane forests of the Chimanimani range and Malawi.

Description
The trunk may be fluted at the base, and the greyish bark is fairly smooth and mottled. Young branches and the undersides of leaves are covered in reddish indumentum. The blunt-tipped, oblong leaves measure some 4-9 by 1.5-5 cm. The indented midrib is connected to a sub-marginal vein by numerous, closely spaced parallel veins. The wavy margin is entire. The white flowers are borne in axillary clusters. The edible fruit are almost round and slightly ribbed, and ripen to a yellow colour.

Gallery

References

Fruits originating in Africa
Trees of Africa
Flora of Kenya
Flora of Mozambique
Flora of Malawi
Flora of Swaziland
Flora of South Africa
Flora of Zimbabwe
Afrotropical realm flora
viridifolium
Southern Zanzibar–Inhambane coastal forest mosaic